Bobete Airport  is an airport serving Bobete, a village in the Thaba-Tseka District of Lesotho.

The runway is at a high elevation. There are nearby ridges and ravines in all quadrants around the airport.

See also

Transport in Lesotho
List of airports in Lesotho

References

External links
OpenStreetMap - Bobete
Bobete Airport
OurAirports - Bobete

Google Earth

Airports in Lesotho